Big Rock Creek is a stream in Harrison and Worth counties in the U.S. state of Missouri. It is a tributary of the East Fork of the Grand River.

The source area lies just east of Missouri Route 46 and the stream flows southwest into southeastern Worth County passing southeast of the community of Allendale.

Big Rock Creek was so named on account of the rocky character of its watercourse.

See also
List of rivers of Missouri

References

Rivers of Harrison County, Missouri
Rivers of Worth County, Missouri
Rivers of Missouri